The Volkswagen A59 HPT16 is a , four-stroke, turbocharged, four-cylinder racing engine, designed, developed, and built by Volkswagen, for sports car racing, between 2000 and 2011. It is based on the developmental  turbocharged four-cylinder engine used in the Mk3 Golf A59 prototype, which itself is based on the EA827 (EA113) engine.

References

A59 HPT16
Straight-four engines